Hog Creek is a stream in the U.S. state of Ohio.  The stream runs  before it empties into the Ottawa River.

The river's name comes from the Native Americans of the area, who saw many wild hogs near its course.

References

Rivers of Allen County, Ohio
Rivers of Hardin County, Ohio
Rivers of Ohio